Jaak Kilmi (born 23 October 1973 in Tallinn) is an Estonian film director, screenwriter and producer.

In 1998 he graduated from Tallinn Pedagogical University's film school. Since 2001, Kilmi has been teaching documentary studies to scenography students at the Estonian Academy of Arts.

Selected filmography
 Külla tuli (1997)
 Revolution of Pigs (2004)
 Disco and Atomic War (2009)
 The New World (2011, producer)
 The Dissidents (2017)
 Jõulud džunglis (2020)

References

External links

1973 births
Living people
Estonian film directors
Estonian film producers
Estonian screenwriters
Academic staff of the Estonian Academy of Arts
Tallinn University alumni
People from Tallinn